Francis "Skip" Gilbert is a retired U.S. soccer player.  He was a two-time NCAA Division I First-Team All-American goalkeeper and played one season in the North American Soccer League.  His business career includes roles in executive management, sales and sales management, marketing and event operations.  He held these roles with companies such as the United States Tennis Association, USA Triathlon, USA Swimming, US Soccer, the Arena Football League and the Sporting News.

Soccer
Gilbert attended the University of Vermont where he played on the men's soccer team from 1979 to 1982.  He was selected as a first team NCAA Division 1 All American goalkeeper in 1982 and 1983.  He graduated with a bachelor's degree in economics and political science and was inducted in the Vermont Athletic Hall of Fame in 1993.  On August 31, 1983, he played one game for the Tampa Bay Rowdies in the North American Soccer League, losing 5-0 against the Fort Lauderdale Strikers.
He played for the US Olympic Development Team in the 1983 Korea Cup tournament in South Korea.

Sports Executive
After retiring from playing, Gilbert worked in the publishing and sports marketing career fields.  He was an account executive at Tennis Magazine, ADWEEK and Ziff-Davis before spending nine years in sales at Sporting News, part of that as the National Sales Manager.  On July 24, 1997, he moved to the United States Soccer Federation where he was the Vice President of Sales.  In June  1998, he became the Chief Marketing Officer at USA Swimming.  In July 2001, Gilbert became  the Vice President-Sponsorship Sales for the Arena Football League.  In July 2003, he was hired as the New York Sales Manager for Outside Magazine.  On March 4, 2005, he became the CEO of USA Triathlon, the U.S. national governing body for the sport. On August 30, 2010 USA Triathlon announced Skip's departure as CEO.  After leaving USAT, Gilbert consulted for Times-7 Sport, a New Zealand-based sport timing company. In June 2011, Gilbert was hired as Chief Business Officer at PSA, an events firm in Reston, VA.  In July 2012, he joined the United States Tennis Association as Managing Director, Professional Tennis Operations & US Open Tournament Manager.

References

External links
 USA Triathlon bio
 
 Interview from US Tennis

1960 births
Living people
All-American men's college soccer players
American soccer players
Association football goalkeepers
North American Soccer League (1968–1984) players
Tampa Bay Rowdies (1975–1993) players
American sports businesspeople
Vermont Catamounts men's soccer players